Aseman Darreh (also Romanized as Āsemān Darreh, Āsmān Darreh, Āsemāndarreh; also known as Maḩmūdābād and ‘Os̄mān Darreh) is a village in Amirabad Rural District, Muchesh District, Kamyaran County, Kurdistan Province, Iran. At the 2006 census, its population was 172, in 38 families. The village is populated by Kurds.

References 

Towns and villages in Kamyaran County
Kurdish settlements in Kurdistan Province